Hezekiah's Pool (Brikhat Hizkiyahu), or the Patriarch's Pool, located in the Christian Quarter of the Old City of Jerusalem, was once a reservoir forming part of the city's ancient water system.

History

Flavius Josephus referred to the pool as Amygdalon, meaning 'almond tree' in Greek, but it is very likely that he derived the name phonetically from the Hebrew word  migdal, meaning 'tower', thus it is believed that the original name was Pool of the Tower or Towers. The pool is also known as the Pool of Pillars, or the Pool of the Patriarch's Bath (Arabic:  Birkat Hammam el-Batrak).

The pool is believed to be the upper pool referred to in the Books of Kings, built by King Hezekiah , who met messengers from the king of Assyria there. At a later time it was fed from the Mamilla Pool, one of the three reservoirs constructed by Herod the Great during the first century BCE by an underground conduit which still partially exists.

The bottom of the pool is cemented and leveled natural rock.  the pool is dry and surrounded by buildings on all sides.

References

External links

 

Buildings and structures completed in the 8th century BC
Buildings and structures completed in the 7th century BC
Reservoirs in Jerusalem
Herod the Great
Classical sites in Jerusalem
Establishments in the Kingdom of Judah
Hezekiah
Books of Kings
Christian Quarter